Takaeang is the second largest island in the Aranuka atoll of Kiribati. It helps form the triangular shape of the atoll by forming the top corner of the triangle. It is connected to the larger island, Buariki, by a sandbank.

The village is also called Takaeang.

References 

Aranuka
Islands of Kiribati